The 2015 Bhayangkara F.C. season is the 5th season in the club's football history, the 2nd consecutive season in the top-flight Liga Indonesia season and the 2nd season competing in the Indonesia Super League.

Review and events

Pre–2015 
Rahmad Darmawan has been sacked as a coach because failed to meet the target.

January 
In 2015 Gubernur Jatim Cup, Persebaya United (Bhayangkara FC) failed to advance the final after draw and lose in group stage versus Persekap Pasuruan and Gresik United, respectively.

Matches

Legend

Friendlies

Indonesia Super League

Statistics

Squad 
.

|}

Clean sheets 
As of 9 April 2015.

Disciplinary record 
As of 9 April 2015.

Transfers

In

Out

Notes 
1.Persebaya Surabaya's goals first.

References

External links 
 Persebaya season at ligaindonesia.co.id 
 2015 Persebaya Surabaya season at soccerway.com

Persebaya Surabaya
Persebaya Surabaya